Thomas Wilson Brown (born December 27, 1972) is an American actor, who began his career at the age of 11 by playing "Augie" in the western film Silverado.

Career
The son of a cattle rancher and rodeo queen, Brown received his first role by answering a small advertisement in a local Santa Fe, New Mexico, newspaper, which was looking for a young boy who could ride a horse.

After the completion of Silverado, Brown worked in a number of films during his teenage years . He is known for his roles as "Jason Lochner" in the television drama Knots Landing, his notable film role as "Little Russ Thompson" in Honey, I Shrunk the Kids, and for his co-starring role in Welcome Home, Roxy Carmichael.

In 1993, Brown appeared on Beverly Hills, 90210 (episode "The Game is Chicken") as the rebellious character Joe. He also had some appearances in TV series like CSI, Daybreak, Nash Bridges, and Walker, Texas Ranger. He also played a small role in the 2007 Steven Seagal movie Urban Justice. Smaller roles include Our House (1986 TV series).

In 2010, Brown co-starred in the independent thriller The Mooring.

In 2017, Brown co-starred in Last Three Days.

In addition to acting, Brown has become a film industry writer, director, and producer, as a co-managing member and co-owner of the independent film production company Thunder Basin Pictures.

Filmography

References

External links

1972 births
American male television actors
Living people
People from Lusk, Wyoming
American male film actors